Richard Roundtree (born July 9, 1942) is an American actor. Roundtree is noted as being "the first black action hero" for his portrayal of private detective John Shaft in the 1971 film Shaft, and its four sequels, released between 1972 and 2019. For his performance in the original film, Roundtree was nominated for the Golden Globe Award for New Star of the Year – Actor in 1972.

Early life and education
Born July 9, 1942, in New Rochelle, New York, to John and Kathryn Roundtree, Roundtree attended New Rochelle High School; graduating in 1961. During high school, Roundtree played for the school's undefeated and nationally ranked football team. After high school, Roundtree attended Southern Illinois University in Carbondale, Illinois. Roundtree dropped out of college in 1963 to begin his career.

Career
Roundtree began his professional career around 1963. Roundtree began modeling in the Ebony Fashion Fair after being scouted by Eunice W. Johnson. After his modeling success with the Fashion Fair, Roundtree began modeling for such products as Johnson Products' Duke hair grease and Salem cigarettes. In 1967, Roundtree joined the Negro Ensemble Company. His first role while a part of the company was portraying boxing legend Jack Johnson in the company's production of The Great White Hope. According to J. E. Franklin, he acted in the Off-Off-Broadway production of her play Mau Mau Room, by the Negro Ensemble Company Workshop Festival, at St. Mark's Playhouse in 1969, directed by Shauneille Perry.

Roundtree was a leading man in early 1970s blaxploitation films, his best-known role being detective John Shaft in the action movie, Shaft (1971) and its sequels, Shaft's Big Score! (1972) and Shaft in Africa (1973). Roundtree also appeared opposite Laurence Olivier and Ben Gazzara in Inchon (1981). On television, he played the slave Sam Bennett in the 1977 television series Roots and Dr. Daniel Reubens on Generations from 1989 to 1991. He played another private detective in 1984's City Heat opposite Clint Eastwood and Burt Reynolds. Although Roundtree worked throughout the 1990s, many of his films were not well-received, but he found success elsewhere in stage plays.

During that period, however, he reemerged on the small screen as a cultural icon. On September 19, 1991, Roundtree appeared in an episode of Beverly Hills, 90210 with Vivica A. Fox.  The episode was "Ashes to Ashes", Roundtree playing Robinson Ashe Jr.  Roundtree appeared in David Fincher's critically acclaimed 1995 movie Seven, and in the 2000 Shaft, again as John Shaft, with Samuel L. Jackson playing the title character, who is described as the original Shaft's nephew. Roundtree guest-starred in several episodes of the first season of Desperate Housewives as an amoral private detective. He also appeared in 1997's George of the Jungle and played a high-school vice-principal in the 2005 movie, Brick. His voice was utilized as the title character in the hit PlayStation game Akuji the Heartless, where Akuji must battle his way out of the depths of hell at the bidding of the Baron.
 In 1997–1998, Roundtree had a leading role as Phil Thomas in the short-lived Fox ensemble drama, 413 Hope St. He portrayed Booker T. Washington in the 1999 television movie Having Our Say: The Delany Sisters' First 100 Years.

Since 2005, Roundtree has appeared in the television series The Closer as Colonel D. B. Walter, U.S.M.C. (retired), the father of a sniper, and in Heroes as Simone's terminally ill father, Charles Deveaux. Next, Roundtree appeared as Eddie's father-in-law in episodes of Lincoln Heights. Most recently, Roundtree had a supporting role in the 2008 Speed Racer film as a racer-turned-commentator who is an icon and hero to Speed. He also appeared in the two-parter in Knight Rider (2008) as the father of FBI Agent Carrie Ravai, and currently co-stars as the father of the lead character on Being Mary Jane, which has aired on BET since 2013.

In 2019, Roundtree co-starred in the comedy film What Men Want, and returned to the role of John Shaft in Shaft, a sequel to the 2000 film, opposite Samuel L. Jackson and Jessie Usher, who portray John Shaft II and John Shaft III, respectively. This time, Roundtree's character was described as Jackson's character's father, while acknowledging that Roundtree had pretended to be Jackson's Shaft's uncle in the 2000 movie.
He also starred in the movie, Family Reunion in 2019.

Personal life and health
Roundtree has been married twice and has five children. His first marriage was to Mary Jane Grant, whom he married on November 27, 1963. Roundtree and Grant had two children before divorcing in December 1973. He dated actress and TV personality Cathy Lee Crosby shortly thereafter.  Roundtree later married Karen M. Ciernia in September 1980; together they had three children. Roundtree and Ciernia divorced in 1998. Roundtree was diagnosed with breast cancer in 1993 and underwent a double mastectomy and chemotherapy.

Filmography

Film

Television

Video games

Awards and nominations

References

Notes

External links
 
 
 

1942 births
Living people
Male actors from New York (state)
African-American male actors
American male film actors
Male models from New York (state)
American male soap opera actors
American male stage actors
American male television actors
Sportspeople from New Rochelle, New York
Players of American football from New York (state)
Southern Illinois Salukis football players
Southern Illinois University Carbondale alumni
21st-century African-American people
20th-century African-American people
African-American history of Westchester County, New York
New Rochelle High School alumni